Banished is a British drama television serial created by Jimmy McGovern. The seven-part serial first aired on 5 March 2015 on BBC Two and was inspired by events in the eighteenth century when Britain established a penal colony in Australia.

Banished was not renewed for a second series.

Plot
Set in the first penal colony founded by the British in New South Wales in the year 1788, in which the British convicts live alongside their Royal Navy marine guards and their officers. A thousand prisoners are guarded by one hundred men, and with five men for every woman, tensions are high from widespread polyamory and rape. Several characters from the real First Fleet are portrayed, though not necessarily accurately.

Production
The series, a co-production between RSJ Films and See-Saw Films, was co-commissioned by BBC Two and BBC Worldwide. The commissioners for BBC Two are Ben Stephenson and Janice Hadlow. Filming took place in Sydney in April 2014 and Manchester afterwards. The series premiered on 25 June 2015, on BBC First in Australia and BBC UKTV in New Zealand.

Cast
In alphabetical order:
Orla Brady as Anne Meredith
Ewen Bremner as Reverend Johnson
MyAnna Buring as Elizabeth Quinn
Ryan Corr as Corporal MacDonald
David Dawson as Captain David Collins
Ned Dennehy as Letters Molloy
Brooke Harman as Deborah, Governor Phillip's housekeeper
Cal MacAninch as Sergeant Timmins
Rory McCann as Marston, the blacksmith
Joseph Millson as Major Robert Ross
Nick Moss as Spragg
Adam Nagaitis as Private Buckley
Genevieve O'Reilly as Reverend Johnson's wife
Jordan Patrick Smith as Private Mulroney
Russell Tovey as James Freeman
Julian Rhind-Tutt as Tommy Barrett
Joanna Vanderham as Katherine 'Kitty' McVitie
David Walmsley as William Stubbins
David Wenham as Captain Arthur Phillip, 1st Governor of New South Wales

Episodes (2015)

Reception
The drama series premiered on 5 March 2015 and gained 3.4 million viewers, giving BBC2 a rare ratings victory over both BBC1 and ITV. It was BBC2’s second biggest new drama launch for several years, behind Wolf Hall, which began in January with an overnight audience of 3.9 million.

The Guardian newspaper named the series "I'm a Convict, Get me Out of Here!" with reference to the reality TV series I'm a Celebrity...Get Me Out of Here!. The Telegraph gave the TV series two stars out of five because of its "grim" nature and comparing it to the TV series Lost.

McGovern, responding to criticisms over the lack of Indigenous Australians on the series, said that "The time-frame in Banished is very short – something just over two weeks – and there is not sufficient time to develop and do justice to indigenous characters".

References

External links
 
 

2010s British drama television series
Australian adventure television series
British adventure television series
2015 British television series debuts
2015 British television series endings
APRA Award winners
BBC television dramas
CBC Television original programming
English-language television shows
Television shows set in colonial Australia
Television shows set in New South Wales
Fiction set in 1788
Television series set in the 1780s
2010s Australian television miniseries
2010s British television miniseries
2015 Australian television series debuts
2015 Australian television series endings
Television shows filmed in Australia